South Paterson is a neighborhood in Paterson, New Jersey, United States.

Location
The neighborhood is bounded by NJ 19 on the west, the border with Clifton, New Jersey to the south, the Passaic River to the east, and I-80 to the north. The Arab community has existed since the late 19th century when many Lebanese and Syrian immigrants moved in. Since then, immigrants from Lebanon have slowed, although many second, third, and fourth-generation residents remain. Recently, Palestinian immigrants have settled in the neighborhood, adding to the mix of Arabs.  In addition to the Arab community, a Turkish community and an Azeri community has existed in the neighborhood since the 1950s made up primarily of Turks and Karachay immigrants.

Little Istanbul
"Little Istanbul" is an area of South Paterson centered on Main Street. This rapidly growing Turkish American enclave is the largest in the United States in addition to housing many Palestinians, Lebanese, Syrians, Jordanians, and Arab immigrants from a variety of other countries. Paterson is home to the largest Turkish-American immigrant community in the United States (Little Istanbul) and the second largest Arab-American community after Dearborn, Michigan. Therefore, it is also called "Little Ramallah". The Paterson-based Arab American Civic Association runs an Arabic language program in the Paterson school district. Paterson's Arab American population was estimated as high as 20,000 in 2015.

The area is also part of Lakeview, which lies to the east of East Railroad Avenue.  The area is bounded on the south by Clifton, on the west by NJ 19 and on the north by I-80.  There are many Middle Eastern restaurants, grocery stores and stores in the area.  Main Street has the largest concentration of these, but there are other Turkish and Arab stores and restaurants throughout the area. The area is mostly residential with commercial zoning along Main Street.

References

Arab-American culture in New Jersey
Lebanese-American history
Middle Eastern-American culture in New Jersey
Neighborhoods in Paterson, New Jersey
Palestinian-American culture
Syrian-American history
Turkish-American history
Islam in New Jersey